Ivan Kirkov (1 January 1932 – 19 September 2010) was a Bulgarian painter and illustrator. He graduated from the National Academy of Arts in Sofia.

References 

1932 births
2010 deaths
Bulgarian painters
Bulgarian illustrators
Bulgarian caricaturists
Bulgarian scenic designers
People from Asenovgrad